Sandal is a village in Tarsus district of Mersin Province, Turkey. It is in the Toros Mountains . The population of village is 223 as of 2012. The village was founded in 1945 by issuing from the neighbouring village.

References

Villages in Tarsus District